Love & Distrust is a 2010 direct-to-video romance film starring Robert Pattinson, Amy Adams, Sam Worthington, Robert Downey Jr. and James Franco.  The movie includes 5 unique short films, following eight individuals from diverse backgrounds on their quest for true contentment.

Plot
The Summer House (Obsession & Suspicion)
The story follows Jane as she flees from England to France to stay with her aunt after her boyfriend Richard dumps her for another girl. However, he follows her to the summer house to try to win her back and, on the night of the Moon landing, tries to make his move, unsuccessfully.
Blue Poles (Suspicion & Sincerity)
 Libby is a young woman who struggles within herself during a time of "coming of age". She is split between commitments, responsibilities, desires and trying to make sense if it all. After stopping Miles, a country guy driving to Canberra to see the Blue Poles, and spending some time with him, she ultimately moves forward on her own.
Grasshopper (Sincerity & Doubt)
The tragic story of two people fighting to break down the walls which stand in the way of human communication. Travis hides behind technology, such as cell phones and computers, to avoid emotional interaction with others. Terri hides behind make-up, high heels and prostitution to avoid emotional interaction with others. Their lives intersect for a brief evening when Terri finds Travis' phone which he left behind on a train. This accident brings them together, but by the end of the evening, Terri commits suicide, leaving a photo of her underage daughter.
Pennies (Doubt & True Love)
Charlotte Brown is a waitress and young single mother who will do anything for her daughter Jenny, and when push comes to shove, she does. With a menacing figure on the other end of the phone and a time limit of two hours, she must raise enough money to ensure that she sees the smiling face of her child again. After dealing with a few very unusual customers through the day, Charlotte finally gets enough gratuity money, but they are taken at gunpoint. Finally a tip from an honest customer comes just in time to pay for her daughter's entry in a talent competition with Pennies from Heaven.
Auto Motives (True Love & False Hope)
The impacts of certain decisions, we made very easily but it is hard to follow through them.

Cast

The Summer House
(directed by Daisy Gili)
Robert Pattinson as Richard
Talulah Riley as Jane
David Burke as Freddie
Anna Calder-Marshall as Priscilla
Marianne Borgo as Marie Pierre
Laurence Beck as Nico

Blue Poles
(directed by Darcy Yuille)
Sam Worthington as Miles
Mungo McKay as Bill
Hallie Shellam as Libby
Emma Randall as Sylvia
Charlie Kevin as Luke

Grasshopper
(directed by Eric Kmetz)
James Franco as Travis
Rachel Miner as Terri
Brad Light as Ted
Dawn Anderson as Rail Passenger
Rian Bishop as Rail Passenger
Michael Patrick Breen as Rail Passenger
Tanika Brown McKelvy as Ticket Attendant
Jim Donald Ellis as Charlie
Kristen Endow as Rail Passenger
Keisuke Hoashi as Bartender
Jerry Hoffman as Station Agent
Jasen Salvatore as Rail Passenger
Marcus Wynnycky as Rail Passenger

Pennies
(directed by Warner Loughlin and Diana Valentine)
Amy Adams as Charlotte Brown
Carol Stanzione as Rosa
David Reivers as The Man
Jason Leiberman as Julio
Travis Miljan as Old Woman
Ronnie Schell as Mr. Tinker
Cerina Vincent as Kimberly
Curtis C. as Sgt. Hillard
James Karr as Crazy
Ron Ostrow as Mr. Stevens
Zack Ward as Stoner Todd
Darren Le Gallo as Cowboy Jim
Mark Kiely as Dad

Auto Motives
(directed by Lorraine Bracco)
Robert Downey Jr. as Rob
James Cameron as himself
Scott Gorman as Scott
Josh Hopkins as Nigel
Michael Imperioli as Stud
Allison Janney as Grechen
Melissa McCarthy as Tonnie
Jim Rash as Accountant
Michael Ruotolo as Italian Kid
Octavia Spencer as Rhonda
Tate Taylor as Dusty
Moon Unit Zappa as Donna

References

External links

2010 direct-to-video films
2010 films
American romantic drama films
American anthology films
Direct-to-video drama films
2010s English-language films
2010s American films